Maxi Herber (8 October 1920 – 20 October 2006) was a German figure skater who competed in pair skating and single skating. She is the youngest figure skating Olympic champion (at the age of 15 years and 128 days) when she won gold in pair skating together with Ernst Baier at the 1936 Winter Olympics.

Born in Munich, Herber was also an accomplished single skater, winning the German nationals three times, from 1933 to 1935. She skated for the Münchner EV (Munich EV) club.

Herber and Baier married after their skating career ended in 1940. They had 3 children. After World War II they skated in ice shows. Later the couple owned a business. In 1964 they were divorced. Supported by the "Deutsche Sporthilfe" (German Sport help organisation) she moved to Oberau near Garmisch-Partenkirchen in Bavaria. Some years later Herber and Baier remarried, but were divorced again.

Herber suffered from Parkinson's disease. In 2000, she moved to the Lenzheim retirement home in Garmisch-Partenkirchen. Soon afterwards she had an exhibition of her watercolor paintings there. She died at age 86 in Garmisch-Partenkirchen.

Results
(ladies singles)

(pairs with Ernst Baier)

1920 births
2006 deaths
German female pair skaters
German female single skaters
Figure skaters at the 1936 Winter Olympics
Olympic figure skaters of Germany
Olympic gold medalists for Germany
Deaths from Parkinson's disease
Neurological disease deaths in Germany
Olympic medalists in figure skating
World Figure Skating Championships medalists
European Figure Skating Championships medalists
Medalists at the 1936 Winter Olympics
Sportspeople from Munich
20th-century German women
21st-century German women